Gaston Marie Dethier (1875 – 1958) was an American organist, pianist, and composer of Belgian birth.

Early life 

Born in Liège, he was the son of organist Emile Jean Joseph Dethier (1849-1933), the brother of violinist Edouard Dethier, and the uncle of physiologist Vincent Dethier. He studied at the Royal Conservatory in his native city with Alexandre Guilmant. He was awarded premiers prix in organ, piano, harmony, and fugue from the conservatory.

In 1886, at just 11 years of age, Dethier was appointed organist at the Église Saint-Jacques-le-Mineur de Liège. He eventually left there to work in the same capacity at the Église Saint-Christophe de Liège.

Relocation to United States 
He emigrated to the United States in 1894 where he eventually became a naturalized citizen. He was organist at The Church of St. Francis Xavier from 1894 until 1907. After he left in 1907 the position was filled by Italian organist Pietro Yon who would eventually become organist at St. Patrick's Cathedral.

Juilliard School 
He taught organ on the faculty of the Juilliard School from 1907 until 1945. Among his notable pupils were Ray Lev, Marcelle Martin, Carl McKinley, Georges-Émile Tanguay, and Powell Weaver.

Dethier is best remembered today as the composer of a set of Variations on 'Adeste Fideles' (1902) which is occasionally performed today.

References

External links
 

1875 births
1958 deaths
American male composers
American classical composers
American classical organists
American male organists
Royal Conservatory of Liège alumni
Juilliard School faculty
Musicians from Liège
Male classical organists